Criss Creek is a tributary of the Deadman River in the British Columbia Interior, Canada.  It is located on the Bonaparte Plateau north of the city of Kamloops.

Name
It was named by locals after a rancher/packer named Christopher Pumpmaker who lived in the area in the 1860s.  The name was later taken up by government surveyors and the name submitted to the Geographic Board of Canada.

Surrounding area and uses
The area surrounding the creek is identified as an area of subsistence hunting by the Secwepemc First Nations.  There are several ranches in the area which utilize the creek for irrigation.  Additionally there have been low quality gold deposits discovered along the creek.

References 

Thompson Country
Bonaparte Country
Rivers of the Cariboo